Glamis railway station served the village of Glamis, Angus, Scotland, from 1838 to 1956 on the Newtyle, Eassie and Glamiss Railway.

History 
The station opened on 4 June 1838 by the Newtyle, Eassie and Glamiss Railway. It closed on 4 July 1846 but reopened on 2 August 1848. To the south was a goods yard, which may have been built on the old station site. The signal box was at the west end of the eastbound platform. The station closed on 11 June 1956.

References

External links 

Disused railway stations in Angus, Scotland
Railway stations in Great Britain opened in 1838
Railway stations in Great Britain closed in 1846
Railway stations in Great Britain opened in 1848
Railway stations in Great Britain closed in 1956
1838 establishments in Scotland
1956 disestablishments in Scotland